Makrania is a monotypic snout moth genus described by Hans Georg Amsel in 1959. Its only species, Makrania belutschistanella, described by the same author, was described from Persia.

References

Pyralidae genera
Phycitinae
Monotypic moth genera
Moths of Asia
Taxa named by Hans Georg Amsel